At the 1912 Summer Olympics, five wrestling events were contested.  They were all for men in the Greco-Roman style. The Light Heavyweight match ended after a nine-hour draw.  The match was finally declared a tie and it was decided that they would each receive a silver medal.

Medal summary

Greco Roman

Participating nations
A total of 170 wrestlers from 18 nations competed at the Stockholm Games:

Medal table

References

 
1912 Summer Olympics events
1912
International wrestling competitions hosted by Sweden
1912 in sport wrestling